This is a list of mathematical theories.

Fields of mathematics
Theories